Blandine Rouille (born 14 April 1980) is a French yacht racer who competed in the 2004 Summer Olympics.

References

1980 births
Living people
French female sailors (sport)
Olympic sailors of France
Sailors at the 2004 Summer Olympics – Europe
21st-century French women